Nee or Née is a surname. Notable people with the surname include:

Ashley Nee (born 1989), American slalom canoeist
Chris Nee, creator of Doc McStuffins
 Danny Nee, basketball coach
 Frédéric Née (born 1975), French football striker
 George H. Nee, American Medal of Honor recipient
 Luis Née (fl. 1789-1794), Franco-Spanish botanist
 Watchman Nee (1903–1972), Chinese Christian leader

See also
 Ni (surname) (倪), sometimes transliterated as Nee

Chinese-language surnames
French-language surnames